WLIV (920 AM, "Country 920") is a radio station broadcasting a country music format. Licensed to Livingston, Tennessee, United States, the station serves the Cookeville area. The station is currently owned by Larry Stone, through licensee Stonecom Cookeville, LLC, and features programming from CNN Radio, Dial Global, and Talk Radio Network.

References

External links
 

Country radio stations in the United States
LIV (AM)
Overton County, Tennessee